The Weight's on the Wheels is the fourth studio album by Canadian indie pop band The Russian Futurists, released on November 16, 2010 on Upper Class Recordings.

Reception
According to Metacritic, The Weight's on the Wheels has a score of 63 out of 100, indicating "generally favorable reviews". One of the most positive reviews came from Robert Christgau, who gave the album an A− grade. In contrast, Matthew Cole of Slant Magazine awarded the album a mere half-star out of five, calling it "a candygram from the heart of a giddy, geeky romantic who has somehow had his rose-tinted frames surgically grafted to his face."

Track listing

References

The Russian Futurists albums
2010 albums
Upper Class Recordings albums